Swoboda is a surname of Czech origin. A variant of Svoboda, it is popular mainly among West Slavic nations. In Czech, the word's primary meaning is 'freedom' or 'liberty'. As a surname, it used to refer to "free men" (to distinguish them from "serfs").

Due to modern Czech orthography, the most common form in the Czech Republic is Svoboda. In the old Czech orthography the name was written Swoboda and this spelling is still preserved in countries where the letter "w" is common, such as Poland or German-speaking countries. Its Slovak version is Sloboda.

Notable people with the name
 Albin Swoboda (disambiguation), multiple individuals
 Alois P. Swoboda (1873–1938), American fitness writer
 Brigitte Swoboda (1943–2019), Austrian actor
 Eduard Swoboda (1814–1902), Austrian painter
 Erich Swoboda (1896–1964), Austrian archaeologist
 Ewa Swoboda (born 1997), Polish track athlete
 Franz Swoboda (1933–2017), Austrian footballer
 Franz Swoboda (gymnast) (1909–unknown), Austrian gymnast
 Hannes Swoboda (born 1946), Austrian politician
 Henry Swoboda (1897–1990), Czech musicologist
 Josefine Swoboda (1861–1924), Austrian portrait painter
 Joseph Wilhelm Swoboda (1806–1882), Czech opera singer
 Kai Swoboda (born 1971), Australian slalom canoeist
 Lary J. Swoboda (1939–2012), American politician
 Markus Swoboda (born 1990), Austrian paracanoeist
 Mike Swoboda (1938–2008), American politician
 Robin Swoboda (born 1958), American news anchor
 Ron Swoboda (born 1944), American baseball player
 Rudolf Swoboda (disambiguation), multiple individuals

Fictional characters
Larry Swoboda, the defense attorney in John Grisham's novel, Witness to a Trial: A Short Story Prequel to The Whistler (2016)
Wade Swoboda, name of actor Casey Saunder's character in the 1990s TV comedy series Grace Under Fire.

References

See also
 

Polish-language surnames
Slavic-language surnames
Surnames of Czech origin